Reginald de Luci (died 1198), also known as Reynold, was an English noble.

He was a son of William de Luci and Cecilia. He served as an itinerant judge in the Counties of Nottingham and Derby in 1173. He was governor of Nottingham Castle when it was captured by William de Ferrers, Earl of Derby in the rebellion against King Henry II of England, during 1174.

Marriage and issue
Reginald married Amabel, daughter of William FitzDuncan and Alice de Rumilly, they are known to have had the following issue:
William de Luci
Reynold de Luci
Richard de Luci of Egremont, married Ada de Morville, had issue.
Cecily de Luci, married Roger de St. John, had issue.
Alice de Luci

Citations

12th-century English people
1198 deaths